So Fresh: The Hits of Winter 2010 is an Australian compilation album. It was released on 18 June 2010.

Track listing
 Usher featuring will.i.am – "OMG" (4:30)
 Brian McFadden featuring Kevin Rudolf – "Just Say So" (3:17)
 Christina Aguilera – "Not Myself Tonight" (3:05)
 Rihanna – "Te Amo" (3:20)
 Vanessa Amorosi featuring Seany B – "Mr. Mysterious" (3:44)
 Taio Cruz featuring Ludacris – "Break Your Heart" (3:06)
 Train – "Hey, Soul Sister" (3:36)
 Lady Gaga – "Alejandro" (The Sound of Arrows Remix) (3:58)
 Kesha – "Your Love Is My Drug" (3:07)
 Adam Lambert – "If I Had You" (3:45)
 Justin Bieber featuring Ludacris – "Baby" (3:36)
 Timbaland featuring Katy Perry – "If We Ever Meet Again" (3:59)
 Cheryl Cole – "Fight for This Love" (3:42)
 Stan Walker – "Unbroken" (4:34)
 The Black Eyed Peas – "Imma Be" (3:53)
 Scouting for Girls – "This Ain't a Love Song" (3:08)
 John Mayer – "Heartbreak Warfare" (4:27)
 Amy Meredith – "Lying" (2:56)
 Florence and the Machine – "Dog Days Are Over" (4:11)
 Scarlett Belle – "Closure" (3:37)

DVD
 Usher featuring will.i.am – "OMG"
 Brian McFadden featuring Kevin Rudolf – "Just Say So"
 Christina Aguilera – "Not Myself Tonight"
 Taio Cruz featuring Ludacris – "Break Your Heart"
 Vanessa Amorosi featuring Seany B – "Mr. Mysterious"
 Train – "Hey, Soul Sister"
 Black Eyed Peas – "Imma Be"
 Kesha – "Your Love Is My Drug"
 John Mayer – "Heartbreak Warfare"
 Justin Bieber featuring Ludacris – "Baby"
 Cheryl Cole – "Fight For This Love"
 Stan Walker – "Unbroken"

Charts

Year-end charts

Certifications

References

So Fresh albums
2010 compilation albums
2010 in Australian music